Silvio Romeo Aquino (born 30 June 1949 in Guazapa) was a former football player from El Salvador who was one of the three non-playing members of his country's squad at the 1982 FIFA World Cup in Spain.

International career
Aquino represented El Salvador in 5 FIFA World Cup qualification matches.

References

1949 births
Living people
People from San Salvador Department
Association football midfielders
Salvadoran footballers
El Salvador international footballers
1982 FIFA World Cup players
Alianza F.C. footballers